Sphaerozoum is a radiolarian genus formerly reported in the subfamily Sphaerozoidae, now reported in the Collosphaeridae. The genus contains bioluminescent species. It is a genus of colonial radiolarians (as opposed to solitary).

Species
The following species are recognized:
Sphaerozoum punctatum (Huxley) Mueller, 1858

References

Radiolarian genera
Bioluminescent radiolarians